Beatrice II of Bigorre (1110-1156), was a Countess regnant suo jure of Bigorre in 1130-1156.

References

 Davezac-Macaya, Essai historique sur le Bigorre

Counts of Bigorre
12th-century women rulers
1110 births
1156 deaths